Josip Ognjanac (born 24 January 1942) is a Serbian former footballer who played as a forward.

Career  
Ognjanac played at the youth level with Red Star Belgrade, and ultimately reached the senior team. He later played with FK Radnički Niš, and Jedinstvo Zemun. Throughout his tenure with Radnički he was named to the Belgrade City All-Star team. Later on, he played abroad for three seasons in Sweden for Malmö FF. In 1968, he ventured out to the United States and settled in Canada where he played in the National Soccer League with the Serbian White Eagles.

In 1970, he played in the North American Soccer League with the Rochester Lancers. He played the remainder of the season with the Serbian White Eagles. In 1971, he returned to the North American Soccer League to play with Montreal Olympique. He finished the 1971 season once more with the Serbian White Eagles. In 1972, he played in the American Soccer League with the New York Greeks.

References  

1942 births
Living people
Croats of Serbia
Yugoslav footballers
Red Star Belgrade footballers
FK Radnički Niš players
FK Zemun players
Malmö FF players
Serbian White Eagles FC players
Rochester Lancers (1967–1980) players
Montreal Olympique players
New York Apollo players
Yugoslav First League players
Canadian National Soccer League players
North American Soccer League (1968–1984) players
American Soccer League (1933–1983) players
People from Zemun
Association football forwards